Euherdmaniidae is a family of tunicates belonging to the order Aplousobranchia.

Genera:
 Euherdmania Ritter, 1904

References

Aplousobranchia